Detroit is the largest city in the U.S. state of Michigan. It is also the largest U.S. city on the United States–Canada border, and the seat of government of Wayne County. The City of Detroit had a population of 639,111 at the 2020 census, making it the 27th-most populous city in the United States. The metropolitan area, known as Metro Detroit, is home to 4.3 million people, making it the second-largest in the Midwest after the Chicago metropolitan area, and the 14th-largest in the United States. Regarded as a major cultural center, Detroit is known for its contributions to music, art, architecture and design, in addition to its historical automotive background.  Time named Detroit as one of the fifty World's Greatest Places of 2022 to explore.

Detroit is a major port on the Detroit River, one of the four major straits that connect the Great Lakes system to the Saint Lawrence Seaway. The City of Detroit anchors the third-largest regional economy in the Midwest, behind Chicago and Minneapolis–Saint Paul, and the 16th-largest in the United States. Detroit is best known as the center of the U.S. automobile industry, and the "Big Three" auto manufacturers General Motors, Ford, and Stellantis North America (Chrysler) are all headquartered in Metro Detroit. , the Detroit metropolitan area is the number one exporting region among 310 defined metropolitan areas in the United States. The Detroit Metropolitan Airport is among the most important hub airports in the United States. Detroit and its neighboring Canadian city Windsor are connected through a highway tunnel, railway tunnel, and the Ambassador Bridge, which is the second-busiest international crossing in North America, after San Diego–Tijuana. Both cities will soon be connected by a new bridge currently under construction, the Gordie Howe International Bridge, which will provide a complete freeway-to-freeway link. The new bridge is expected to be open by 2024.

In 1701, Antoine de la Mothe Cadillac and Alphonse de Tonty founded Fort Pontchartrain du Détroit, the future city of Detroit. During the late nineteenth and early twentieth century, it became an important industrial hub at the center of the Great Lakes region. The city's population became the fourth-largest in the nation in 1920, after only New York City, Chicago and Philadelphia, with the expansion of the auto industry in the early 20th century. As Detroit's industrialization took off, the Detroit River became the busiest commercial hub in the world. The strait carried over 65 million tons of shipping commerce through Detroit to locations all over the world each year; the freight throughput was more than three times that of New York and about four times that of London. By the 1940s, the city's population remained the fourth-largest in the country. However, due to industrial restructuring, the loss of jobs in the auto industry, and rapid suburbanization, among other reasons, Detroit entered a state of urban decay and lost considerable population from the late 20th century to the present. Since reaching a peak of 1.85 million at the 1950 census, Detroit's population has declined by more than 65 percent. In 2013, Detroit became the largest U.S. city to file for bankruptcy, which it successfully exited in December 2014, when the city government regained control of Detroit's finances.

Detroit's diverse culture has had both local and international influence, particularly in music, with the city giving rise to the genres of Motown and techno, and playing an important role in the development of jazz, hip-hop, rock, and punk. The rapid growth of Detroit in its boom years resulted in a globally unique stock of architectural monuments and historic places. Since the 2000s, conservation efforts have managed to save many architectural pieces and achieved several large-scale revitalizations, including the restoration of several historic theatres and entertainment venues, high-rise renovations, new sports stadiums, and a riverfront revitalization project. More recently, the population of Downtown Detroit, Midtown Detroit, and various other neighborhoods have increased. An increasingly popular tourist destination, Detroit receives 16 million visitors per year. In 2015, Detroit was named a "City of Design" by UNESCO, the first U.S. city to receive that designation.

Toponymy 
Detroit is named after the Detroit River, connecting Lake Huron with Lake Erie. The city's name comes from the French word  meaning  as the city was situated on a narrow passage of water linking two lakes. The river was known as “," among the French, which meant .

History

Early settlement
Paleo-Indian people inhabited areas near Detroit as early as 11,000 years ago including the culture referred to as the Mound-builders. By the 17th century, the region was inhabited by Huron, Odawa, Potawatomi and Iroquois peoples. The area is known by the Anishinaabe people as Waawiiyaataanong, translating to 'where the water curves around'.

The first Europeans did not penetrate into the region and reach the straits of Detroit until French missionaries and traders worked their way around the League of the Iroquois, with whom they were at war and other Iroquoian tribes in the 1630s. The Huron and Neutral peoples held the north side of Lake Erie until the 1650s, when the Iroquois pushed both and the Erie people away from the lake and its beaver-rich feeder streams in the Beaver Wars of 1649–1655. By the 1670s, the war-weakened Iroquois laid claim to as far south as the Ohio River valley in northern Kentucky as hunting grounds, and had absorbed many other Iroquoian peoples after defeating them in war. For the next hundred years, virtually no British or French action was contemplated without consultation with the Iroquois or consideration of their likely response. When the French and Indian War evicted the Kingdom of France from Canada, it removed one barrier to American colonists migrating west. 
 
British negotiations with the Iroquois would both prove critical and lead to a Crown policy limiting settlements below the Great Lakes and west of the Alleghenies. Many colonial American would-be migrants resented this restraint and became supporters of the American Revolution. The 1778 raids and resultant 1779 decisive Sullivan Expedition reopened the Ohio Country to westward emigration, which began almost immediately. By 1800 white settlers were pouring westwards.

Later settlement

The city was named by French colonists, referring to the Detroit River (meaning the strait of Lake Erie), linking Lake Huron and Lake Erie; in the historical context, the strait included the St. Clair River, Lake St. Clair and the Detroit River.

On July 24, 1701, the French explorer Antoine de la Mothe Cadillac, with his lieutenant Alphonse de Tonty and along with more than a hundred other settlers, began constructing a small fort on the north bank of the Detroit River. Cadillac would later name the settlement Fort Pontchartrain du Détroit, after Louis Phélypeaux, comte de Pontchartrain, Minister of Marine under Louis XIV. A church was soon founded here, and the parish was known as Sainte Anne de Détroit. France offered free land to colonists to attract families to Detroit; when it reached a population of 800 in 1765, this was the largest European settlement between Montreal and New Orleans, both also French settlements, in the former colonies of New France and La Louisiane, respectively.

By 1773, after the addition of Anglo-American settlers, the population of Detroit was 1,400. By 1778, its population reached 2,144 and it was the third-largest city in what was known as the Province of Quebec since the British takeover of French colonies following their victory in the Seven Years' War.

The region's economy was based on the lucrative fur trade, in which numerous Native American people had important roles as trappers and traders. Today the flag of Detroit reflects its French colonial heritage. Descendants of the earliest French and French-Canadian settlers formed a cohesive community, who gradually were superseded as the dominant population after more Anglo-American settlers arrived in the early 19th century with American westward migration. Living along the shores of Lake St. Clair and south to Monroe and downriver suburbs, the ethnic French Canadians of Detroit, also known as Muskrat French in reference to the fur trade, remain a subculture in the region in the 21st century.

During the French and Indian War (1754–63), the North American front of the Seven Years' War between Britain and France, British troops gained control of the settlement in 1760 and shortened its name to Detroit. Several regional Native American tribes, such as the Potowatomi, Ojibwe and Huron, launched Pontiac's War in 1763, and laid siege to Fort Detroit, but failed to capture it. In defeat, France ceded its territory in North America east of the Mississippi to Britain following the war.

Following the American Revolutionary War and the establishment of the United States as an independent country, Britain ceded Detroit along with other territories in the area under the Jay Treaty (1796), which established the northern border with its colony of Canada. The Great Fire of 1805 destroyed most of the Detroit settlement, which had primarily buildings made of wood. One stone fort, a river warehouse, and brick chimneys of former wooden homes were the sole structures to survive. Of the 600 Detroit residents in this area, none died in the fire.

19th century

From 1805 to 1847, Detroit was the capital of Michigan as a territory and as a state. William Hull, the United States commander at Detroit surrendered without a fight to British troops and their Native American allies during the War of 1812 in the siege of Detroit, believing his forces were vastly outnumbered. The Battle of Frenchtown (January 18–23, 1813) was part of a U.S. effort to retake the city, and U.S. troops suffered their highest fatalities of any battle in the war. This battle is commemorated at River Raisin National Battlefield Park south of Detroit in Monroe County. Detroit was recaptured by the United States later that year.

The settlement was incorporated as a city in 1815. As the city expanded, a geometric street plan developed by Augustus B. Woodward was followed, featuring grand boulevards as in Paris.

Prior to the American Civil War, the city's access to the Canada–US border made it a key stop for refugee slaves gaining freedom in the North along the Underground Railroad. Many went across the Detroit River to Canada to escape pursuit by slave catchers. An estimated 20,000 to 30,000 African-American refugees settled in Canada. George DeBaptiste was considered to be the "president" of the Detroit Underground Railroad, William Lambert the "vice president" or "secretary", and Laura Haviland the "superintendent".

Numerous men from Detroit volunteered to fight for the Union during the American Civil War, including the 24th Michigan Infantry Regiment. It was part of the legendary Iron Brigade, which fought with distinction and suffered 82% casualties at the Battle of Gettysburg in 1863. When the First Volunteer Infantry Regiment arrived to fortify Washington, D.C., President Abraham Lincoln is quoted as saying, "Thank God for Michigan!" George Armstrong Custer led the Michigan Brigade during the Civil War and called them the "Wolverines".

During the late 19th century, wealthy industry and shipping magnates commissioned the design and construction of several Gilded Age mansions east and west of the current downtown, along the major avenues of the Woodward plan. Most notable among them was the David Whitney House at 4421 Woodward Avenue, and the grand avenue became a favored address for mansions. During this period, some referred to Detroit as the "Paris of the West" for its architecture, grand avenues in the Paris style, and for Washington Boulevard, recently electrified by Thomas Edison. The city had grown steadily from the 1830s with the rise of shipping, shipbuilding, and manufacturing industries. Strategically located along the Great Lakes waterway, Detroit emerged as a major port and transportation hub. 

In 1896, a thriving carriage trade prompted Henry Ford to build his first automobile in a rented workshop on Mack Avenue. During this growth period, Detroit expanded its borders by annexing all or part of several surrounding villages and townships.

20th century

In 1903, Henry Ford founded the Ford Motor Company. Ford's manufacturing—and those of automotive pioneers William C. Durant, the Dodge Brothers, Packard, and Walter Chrysler—established Detroit's status in the early 20th century as the world's automotive capital. The growth of the auto industry was reflected by changes in businesses throughout the Midwest and nation, with the development of garages to service vehicles and gas stations, as well as factories for parts and tires.

In 1907, the Detroit River carried 67,292,504 tons of shipping commerce through Detroit to locations all over the world. For comparison, London shipped 18,727,230 tons, and New York shipped 20,390,953 tons. The river was dubbed "the Greatest Commercial Artery on Earth" by The Detroit News in 1908.

With the rapid growth of industrial workers in the auto factories, labor unions such as the American Federation of Labor and the United Auto Workers fought to organize workers to gain them better working conditions and wages. They initiated strikes and other tactics in support of improvements such as the 8-hour day/40-hour work week, increased wages, greater benefits, and improved working conditions. The labor activism during those years increased the influence of union leaders in the city such as Jimmy Hoffa of the Teamsters and Walter Reuther of the Autoworkers.

Due to the booming auto industry, Detroit became the fourth-largest city in the nation in 1920, following New York City, Chicago and Philadelphia.

The prohibition of alcohol from 1920 to 1933 resulted in the Detroit River becoming a major conduit for smuggling of illegal Canadian spirits.

Detroit, like many places in the United States, developed racial conflict and discrimination in the 20th century following the rapid demographic changes as hundreds of thousands of new workers were attracted to the industrial city; in a short period, it became the fourth-largest city in the nation. The Great Migration brought rural blacks from the South; they were outnumbered by southern whites who also migrated to the city. Immigration brought southern and eastern Europeans of Catholic and Jewish faith; these new groups competed with native-born whites for jobs and housing in the booming city.

Detroit was one of the major Midwest cities that was a site for the dramatic urban revival of the Ku Klux Klan beginning in 1915. "By the 1920s the city had become a stronghold of the KKK", whose members primarily opposed Catholic and Jewish immigrants, but also practiced discrimination against Black Americans. Even after the decline of the KKK in the late 1920s, the Black Legion, a secret vigilante group, was active in the Detroit area in the 1930s. One-third of its estimated 20,000 to 30,000 members in Michigan were based in the city. It was defeated after numerous prosecutions following the kidnapping and murder in 1936 of Charles Poole, a Catholic organizer with the federal Works Progress Administration. Some 49 men of the Black Legion were convicted of numerous crimes, with many sentenced to life in prison for murder.

In the 1940s the world's "first urban depressed freeway" ever built, the Davison, was constructed in Detroit. During World War II, the government encouraged retooling of the American automobile industry in support of the Allied powers, leading to Detroit's key role in the American Arsenal of Democracy.

Jobs expanded so rapidly due to the defense buildup in World War II that 400,000 people migrated to the city from 1941 to 1943, including 50,000 blacks in the second wave of the Great Migration, and 350,000 whites, many of them from the South. Whites, including ethnic Europeans, feared black competition for jobs and scarce housing. The federal government prohibited discrimination in defense work, but when in June 1943 Packard promoted three black people to work next to whites on its assembly lines, 25,000 white workers walked off the job.

The Detroit race riot of 1943 took place in June, three weeks after the Packard plant protest, beginning with an altercation at Belle Isle. Blacks suffered 25 deaths (of a total of 34), three-quarters of 600 wounded, and most of the losses due to property damage. Rioters moved through the city, and young whites traveled across town to attack more settled blacks in their neighborhood of Paradise Valley.

Postwar era
Industrial mergers in the 1950s, especially in the automobile sector, increased oligopoly in the American auto industry. Detroit manufacturers such as Packard and Hudson merged into other companies and eventually disappeared. At its peak population of 1,849,568, in the 1950 Census, the city was the fifth-largest in the United States, after New York City, Chicago, Philadelphia and Los Angeles.

In this postwar era, the auto industry continued to create opportunities for many African Americans from the South, who continued with their Great Migration to Detroit and other northern and western cities to escape the strict Jim Crow laws and racial discrimination policies of the South. Postwar Detroit was a prosperous industrial center of mass production. The auto industry comprised about 60% of all industry in the city, allowing space for a plethora of separate booming businesses including stove making, brewing, furniture building, oil refineries, pharmaceutical manufacturing, and more. The expansion of jobs created unique opportunities for black Americans, who saw novel high employment rates: there was a 103% increase in the number of blacks employed in postwar Detroit. Black Americans who immigrated to northern industrial cities from the south still faced intense racial discrimination in the employment sector. Racial discrimination kept the workforce and better jobs predominantly white, while many black Detroiters held lower-paying factory jobs. Despite changes in demographics as the city's black population expanded, Detroit's police force, fire department, and other city jobs continued to be held by predominantly white residents. This created an unbalanced racial power dynamic.

Unequal opportunities in employment resulted in unequal housing opportunities for the majority of the black community: with overall lower incomes and facing the backlash of discriminatory housing policies, the black community was limited to lower cost, lower quality housing in the city. The surge in Detroit's black population with the Great Migration augmented the strain on housing scarcity. The liveable areas available to the black community were limited, and as a result, families often crowded together in unsanitary, unsafe, and illegal quarters. Such discrimination became increasingly evident in the policies of redlining implemented by banks and federal housing groups, which almost completely restricted the ability of blacks to improve their housing and encouraged white people to guard the racial divide that defined their neighborhoods. As a result, black people were often denied bank loans to obtain better housing, and interest rates and rents were unfairly inflated to prevent their moving into white neighborhoods. White residents and political leaders largely opposed the influx of black Detroiters to white neighborhoods, believing that their presence would lead to neighborhood deterioration (most predominantly black neighborhoods deteriorated due to local and federal governmental neglect). This perpetuated a cyclical exclusionary process that marginalized the agency of black Detroiters by trapping them in the unhealthiest, least safe areas of the city.

As in other major American cities in the postwar era, construction of a federally subsidized, extensive highway and freeway system around Detroit, and pent-up demand for new housing stimulated suburbanization; highways made commuting by car for higher-income residents easier. However, this construction had negative implications for many lower-income urban residents. Highways were constructed through and completely demolished neighborhoods of poor residents and black communities who had less political power to oppose them. The neighborhoods were mostly low income, considered blighted, or made up of older housing where investment had been lacking due to racial redlining, so the highways were presented as a kind of urban renewal. These neighborhoods (such as Black Bottom and Paradise Valley) were extremely important to the black communities of Detroit, providing spaces for independent black businesses and social/cultural organizations. Their destruction displaced residents with little consideration of the effects of breaking up functioning neighborhoods and businesses.

In 1956, Detroit's last heavily used electric streetcar line, which traveled along the length of Woodward Avenue, was removed and replaced with gas-powered buses. It was the last line of what had once been a 534-mile network of electric streetcars. In 1941, at peak times, a streetcar ran on Woodward Avenue every 60 seconds.

All of these changes in the area's transportation system favored low-density, auto-oriented development rather than high-density urban development. Industry also moved to the suburbs, seeking large plots of land for single-story factories. By the 21st century, the metro Detroit area had developed as one of the most sprawling job markets in the United States; combined with poor public transport, this resulted in many new jobs being beyond the reach of urban low-income workers.

In 1950, the city held about one-third of the state's population, anchored by its industries and workers. Over the next sixty years, the city's population declined to less than 10 percent of the state's population. During the same time period, the sprawling Detroit metropolitan area, which surrounds and includes the city, grew to contain more than half of Michigan's population. The shift of population and jobs eroded Detroit's tax base.

In June 1963, Rev. Martin Luther King Jr. gave a major speech as part of a civil rights march in Detroit that foreshadowed his "I Have a Dream" speech in Washington, D.C., two months later. While the civil rights movement gained significant federal civil rights laws in 1964 and 1965, longstanding inequities resulted in confrontations between the police and inner-city black youth who wanted change.

Longstanding tensions in Detroit culminated in the Twelfth Street riot in July 1967. Governor George W. Romney ordered the Michigan National Guard into Detroit, and President Johnson sent in U.S. Army troops. The result was 43 dead, 467 injured, over 7,200 arrests, and more than 2,000 buildings destroyed, mostly in black residential and business areas. Thousands of small businesses closed permanently or relocated to safer neighborhoods. The affected district lay in ruins for decades. According to the Chicago Tribune, it was the 3rd most costly riot in the United States.

On August 18, 1970, the NAACP filed suit against Michigan state officials, including Governor William Milliken, charging de facto public school segregation. The NAACP argued that although schools were not legally segregated, the city of Detroit and its surrounding counties had enacted policies to maintain racial segregation in public schools. The NAACP also suggested a direct relationship between unfair housing practices and educational segregation, as the composition of students in the schools followed segregated neighborhoods. The District Court held all levels of government accountable for the segregation in its ruling. The Sixth Circuit Court affirmed some of the decision, holding that it was the state's responsibility to integrate across the segregated metropolitan area. The U.S. Supreme Court took up the case February 27, 1974. The subsequent Milliken v. Bradley decision had nationwide influence. In a narrow decision, the US Supreme Court found schools were a subject of local control, and suburbs could not be forced to aid with the desegregation of the city's school district.

"Milliken was perhaps the greatest missed opportunity of that period", said Myron Orfield, professor of law at the University of Minnesota. "Had that gone the other way, it would have opened the door to fixing nearly all of Detroit's current problems." John Mogk, a professor of law and an expert in urban planning at Wayne State University in Detroit, says, 
Everybody thinks that it was the riots [in 1967] that caused the white families to leave. Some people were leaving at that time but, really, it was after Milliken that you saw mass flight to the suburbs. If the case had gone the other way, it is likely that Detroit would not have experienced the steep decline in its tax base that has occurred since then.

1970s and decline

In November 1973, the city elected Coleman Young as its first black mayor. After taking office, Young emphasized increasing racial diversity in the police department, which was predominantly white. Young also worked to improve Detroit's transportation system, but the tension between Young and his suburban counterparts over regional matters was problematic throughout his mayoral term. In 1976, the federal government offered $600 million for building a regional rapid transit system, under a single regional authority. But the inability of Detroit and its suburban neighbors to solve conflicts over transit planning resulted in the region losing the majority of funding for rapid transit.

Following the failure to reach a regional agreement over the larger system, the city moved forward with construction of the elevated downtown circulator portion of the system, which became known as the Detroit People Mover.

The gasoline crises of 1973 and 1979 also affected Detroit and the U.S. auto industry. Buyers chose smaller, more fuel-efficient cars made by foreign makers as the price of gas rose. Efforts to revive the city were stymied by the struggles of the auto industry, as their sales and market share declined. Automakers laid off thousands of employees and closed plants in the city, further eroding the tax base. To counteract this, the city used eminent domain to build two large new auto assembly plants in the city.

As mayor, Young sought to revive the city by seeking to increase investment in the city's declining downtown. The Renaissance Center, a mixed-use office and retail complex, opened in 1977. This group of skyscrapers was an attempt to keep businesses in downtown. Young also gave city support to other large developments to attract middle and upper-class residents back to the city. Despite the Renaissance Center and other projects, the downtown area continued to lose businesses to the automobile-dependent suburbs. Major stores and hotels closed, and many large office buildings went vacant. Young was criticized for being too focused on downtown development and not doing enough to lower the city's high crime rate and improve city services to residents.

High unemployment was compounded by middle-class flight to the suburbs, and some residents leaving the state to find work. The result for the city was a higher proportion of poor in its population, reduced tax base, depressed property values, abandoned buildings, abandoned neighborhoods, high crime rates, and a pronounced demographic imbalance.

1980s
On August 16, 1987, Northwest Airlines Flight 255 crashed near Detroit Metro airport, killing all but one of the 155 people on board, as well as two people on the ground.

1990s & 2000s

In 1993, Young retired as Detroit's longest-serving mayor, deciding not to seek a sixth term. That year the city elected Dennis Archer, a former Michigan Supreme Court justice. Archer prioritized downtown development and easing tensions with Detroit's suburban neighbors. A referendum to allow casino gambling in the city passed in 1996; several temporary casino facilities opened in 1999, and permanent downtown casinos with hotels opened in 2007–08.

Campus Martius, a reconfiguration of downtown's main intersection as a new park, was opened in 2004. The park has been cited as one of the best public spaces in the United States. The city's riverfront on the Detroit River has been the focus of redevelopment, following successful examples of other older industrial cities. In 2001, the first portion of the International Riverfront was completed as a part of the city's 300th-anniversary celebration.

2010s

In September 2008, Mayor Kwame Kilpatrick (who had served for six years) resigned following felony convictions. In 2013, Kilpatrick was convicted on 24 federal felony counts, including mail fraud, wire fraud, and racketeering, and was sentenced to 28 years in federal prison. The former mayor's activities cost the city an estimated $20 million.

The city's financial crisis resulted in Michigan taking over administrative control of its government. The state governor declared a financial emergency in March 2013, appointing Kevyn Orr as emergency manager. On July 18, 2013, Detroit became the largest U.S. city to file for bankruptcy. It was declared bankrupt by U.S. District Court on December 3, 2013, in light of the city's $18.5 billion debt and its inability to fully repay its thousands of creditors. On November 7, 2014, the city's plan for exiting bankruptcy was approved. The following month, on December 11, the city officially exited bankruptcy. The plan allowed the city to eliminate $7 billion in debt and invest $1.7 billion into improved city services.

One way the city obtained this money was through the Detroit Institute of Arts. Holding over 60,000 pieces of art worth billions of dollars, some saw it as the key to funding this investment. The city came up with a plan to monetize the art and sell it leading to the DIA becoming a private organization. After months of legal battles, the city finally got hundreds of millions of dollars towards funding a new Detroit.

One of the largest post-bankruptcy efforts to improve city services has been to work to fix the city's broken street lighting system. At one time it was estimated that 40% of lights were not working, which resulted in public safety issues and abandonment of housing. The plan called for replacing outdated high-pressure sodium lights with 65,000 LED lights. Construction began in late 2014 and finished in December 2016; Detroit is the largest U.S. city with all LED street lighting.

In the 2010s, several initiatives were taken by Detroit's citizens and new residents to improve the cityscape by renovating and revitalizing neighborhoods. Such projects include volunteer renovation groups and various urban gardening movements. Miles of associated parks and landscaping have been completed in recent years. In 2011, the Port Authority Passenger Terminal opened, with the riverwalk connecting Hart Plaza to the Renaissance Center.

One symbol of the city's decades-long decline, the Michigan Central Station, was long vacant. The city renovated it with new windows, elevators and facilities, completing the work in December 2015. In 2018, Ford Motor Company purchased the building and plans to use it for mobility testing with a potential return of train service. Several other landmark buildings have been privately renovated and adapted as condominiums, hotels, offices, or for cultural uses. Detroit is mentioned as a city of renaissance and has reversed many of the trends of the prior decades.

The city has also seen a rise in gentrification. In downtown, for example, the construction of Little Caesars Arena brought with it new, high class shops and restaurants up and down Woodward Ave. Office tower and condominium construction has led to an influx of wealthy families, but also a displacement of long-time residents and culture.

Areas outside of downtown and other recently revived areas have an average household income of about 25% less than the gentrified areas, a gap that is continuing to grow. Rents and cost of living in these gentrified areas rise every year, pushing minorities and the poor out, causing more and more racial disparity and separation in the city. In 2019, the cost of a one-bedroom loft in Rivertown reached $300,000, with a five-year sale price change of over 500% and average income rising by 18%.

Geography

Metropolitan area

Topography
Detroit is the principal city in Metro Detroit and Southeast Michigan. It is situated in the Midwestern United States and the Great Lakes region.

The Detroit River International Wildlife Refuge is the only international wildlife preserve in North America, and is uniquely located in the heart of a major metropolitan area. The Refuge includes islands, coastal wetlands, marshes, shoals, and waterfront lands along  of the Detroit River and Western Lake Erie shoreline.

The city slopes gently from the northwest to southeast on a till plain composed largely of glacial and lake clay.

Belle Isle Park is a  island park in the Detroit River, between Detroit and Windsor, Ontario. It is connected to the mainland by the MacArthur Bridge in Detroit. Belle Isle Park contains such attractions as the James Scott Memorial Fountain, the Belle Isle Conservatory, the Detroit Yacht Club on an adjacent island, a half-mile (800 m) beach, a golf course, a nature center, monuments, and gardens. Both the Detroit and Windsor skylines can be viewed at the island's Sunset Point.

Three road systems cross the city: the original French template, with avenues radiating from the waterfront, and true north–south roads based on the Northwest Ordinance township system. The city is north of Windsor, Ontario. Detroit is the only major city along the Canada–U.S. border in which one travels south in order to cross into Canada.

Detroit has four border crossings: the Ambassador Bridge and the Detroit–Windsor Tunnel provide motor vehicle thoroughfares, with the Michigan Central Railway Tunnel providing railroad access to and from Canada. The fourth border crossing is the Detroit–Windsor Truck Ferry, near the Windsor Salt Mine and Zug Island.

Climate

Detroit and the rest of southeastern Michigan have a hot-summer humid continental climate (Köppen: Dfa) which is influenced by the Great Lakes like other places in the state; the city and close-in suburbs are part of USDA Hardiness zone 6b, while the more distant northern and western suburbs generally are included in zone 6a. Winters are cold, with moderate snowfall and temperatures not rising above freezing on an average 44 days annually, while dropping to or below  on an average 4.4 days a year; summers are warm to hot with temperatures exceeding  on 12 days. The warm season runs from May to September. The average window for freezing temperatures is October 20 thru April 22, allowing a growing season of 180 days.

Thunderstorms are frequent in the Detroit area. These usually occur during spring and summer.

Cityscape

Architecture

Seen in panorama, Detroit's waterfront shows a variety of architectural styles. The post modern Neo-Gothic spires of the One Detroit Center (1993) were designed to refer to the city's Art Deco skyscrapers. Together with the Renaissance Center, these buildings form a distinctive and recognizable skyline. Examples of the Art Deco style include the Guardian Building and Penobscot Building downtown, as well as the Fisher Building and Cadillac Place in the New Center area near Wayne State University. Among the city's prominent structures are United States' largest Fox Theatre, the Detroit Opera House, and the Detroit Institute of Arts, all built in the early 20th century.

While the Downtown and New Center areas contain high-rise buildings, the majority of the surrounding city consists of low-rise structures and single-family homes. Outside of the city's core, residential high-rises are found in upper-class neighborhoods such as the East Riverfront, extending toward Grosse Pointe, and the Palmer Park neighborhood just west of Woodward. The University Commons-Palmer Park district in northwest Detroit, near the University of Detroit Mercy and Marygrove College, anchors historic neighborhoods including Palmer Woods, Sherwood Forest, and the University District.

Forty-two significant structures or sites are listed on the National Register of Historic Places. Neighborhoods constructed prior to World War II feature the architecture of the times, with wood-frame and brick houses in the working-class neighborhoods, larger brick homes in middle-class neighborhoods, and ornate mansions in upper-class neighborhoods such as Brush Park, Woodbridge, Indian Village, Palmer Woods, Boston-Edison, and others.

Some of the oldest neighborhoods are along the major Woodward and East Jefferson corridors, which formed spines of the city. Some newer residential construction may also be found along the Woodward corridor and in the far west and northeast. The oldest extant neighborhoods include West Canfield and Brush Park. There have been multi-million dollar restorations of existing homes and construction of new homes and condominiums here.

The city has one of the United States' largest surviving collections of late 19th- and early 20th-century buildings. Architecturally significant churches and cathedrals in the city include St. Joseph's, Old St. Mary's, the Sweetest Heart of Mary, and the Cathedral of the Most Blessed Sacrament.

The city has substantial activity in urban design, historic preservation, and architecture. A number of downtown redevelopment projects—of which Campus Martius Park is one of the most notable—have revitalized parts of the city. Grand Circus Park and historic district is near the city's theater district; Ford Field, home of the Detroit Lions, and Comerica Park, home of the Detroit Tigers.  Little Caesars Arena, a new home for the Detroit Red Wings and the Detroit Pistons, with attached residential, hotel, and retail use, opened on September 5, 2017. The plans for the project call for mixed-use residential on the blocks surrounding the arena and the renovation of the vacant 14-story Eddystone Hotel. It will be a part of The District Detroit, a group of places owned by Olympia Entertainment Inc., including Comerica Park and the Detroit Opera House, among others.

The Detroit International Riverfront includes a partially completed three-and-one-half-mile riverfront promenade with a combination of parks, residential buildings, and commercial areas. It extends from Hart Plaza to the MacArthur Bridge, which connects to Belle Isle Park, the largest island park in a U.S. city. The riverfront includes Tri-Centennial State Park and Harbor, Michigan's first urban state park. Civic planners envision the pedestrian parks will stimulate residential redevelopment of riverfront properties condemned under eminent domain.

Other major parks include River Rouge (in the southwest side), the largest park in Detroit; Palmer (north of Highland Park) and Chene Park (on the east river downtown).

Neighborhoods

Detroit has a variety of neighborhood types. The revitalized Downtown, Midtown, Corktown, New Center areas feature many historic buildings and are high density, while further out, particularly in the northeast and on the fringes, high vacancy levels are problematic, for which a number of solutions have been proposed. In 2007, Downtown Detroit was recognized as the best city neighborhood in which to retire among the United States' largest metro areas by CNNMoney editors.

Lafayette Park is a revitalized neighborhood on the city's east side, part of the Ludwig Mies van der Rohe residential district. The  development was originally called the Gratiot Park. Planned by Mies van der Rohe, Ludwig Hilberseimer and Alfred Caldwell it includes a landscaped,  park with no through traffic, in which these and other low-rise apartment buildings are situated. Immigrants have contributed to the city's neighborhood revitalization, especially in southwest Detroit. Southwest Detroit has experienced a thriving economy in recent years, as evidenced by new housing, increased business openings and the recently opened Mexicantown International Welcome Center.

The city has numerous neighborhoods consisting of vacant properties resulting in low inhabited density in those areas, stretching city services and infrastructure. These neighborhoods are concentrated in the northeast and on the city's fringes. A 2009 parcel survey found about a quarter of residential lots in the city to be undeveloped or vacant, and about 10% of the city's housing to be unoccupied. The survey also reported that most (86%) of the city's homes are in good condition with a minority (9%) in fair condition needing only minor repairs.

To deal with vacancy issues, the city has begun demolishing the derelict houses, razing 3,000 of the total 10,000 in 2010, but the resulting low density creates a strain on the city's infrastructure. To remedy this, a number of solutions have been proposed including resident relocation from more sparsely populated neighborhoods and converting unused space to urban agricultural use, including Hantz Woodlands, though the city expects to be in the planning stages for up to another two years.

Public funding and private investment have also been made with promises to rehabilitate neighborhoods. In April 2008, the city announced a $300-million stimulus plan to create jobs and revitalize neighborhoods, financed by city bonds and paid for by earmarking about 15% of the wagering tax. The city's working plans for neighborhood revitalizations include 7-Mile/Livernois, Brightmoor, East English Village, Grand River/Greenfield, North End, and Osborn. Private organizations have pledged substantial funding to the efforts. Additionally, the city has cleared a  section of land for large-scale neighborhood construction, which the city is calling the Far Eastside Plan. In 2011, Mayor Dave Bing announced a plan to categorize neighborhoods by their needs and prioritize the most needed services for those neighborhoods.

Demographics

In the 2020 United States Census, the city had 639,111 residents, ranking it the 27th most populous city in the United States.

2020 census

Of the large shrinking cities in the United States, Detroit has had the most dramatic decline in the population of the past 70 years (down 1,210,457) and the second-largest percentage decline (down 65.4%). While the drop in Detroit's population has been ongoing since 1950, the most dramatic period was the significant 25% decline between the 2000 and 2010 Census.

Previously a major population center and site of worldwide automobile manufacturing, Detroit has suffered a long economic decline produced by numerous factors. Like many industrial American cities, Detroit's peak population was in 1950, before postwar suburbanization took effect. The peak population was 1.85 million people.

Following suburbanization, industrial restructuring, and loss of jobs, by the 2010 census, the city had less than 40 percent of that number, with just over 700,000 residents. The city has declined in population in each census since 1950. The population collapse has resulted in large numbers of abandoned homes and commercial buildings, and areas of the city hit hard by urban decay.

Detroit's 639,111 residents represent 269,445 households, and 162,924 families residing in the city. Housing density has declined. The city has demolished thousands of Detroit's abandoned houses, planting some areas and in others allowing the growth of urban prairie.

Of the 269,445 households, 34.4% had children under the age of 18 living with them, 21.5% were married couples living together, 31.4% had a female householder with no husband present, 39.5% were non-families, 34.0% were made up of individuals, and 3.9% had someone living alone who was 65 years of age or older. The average household size was 2.59, and the average family size was 3.36.

There was a wide distribution of age in the city, with 31.1% under the age of 18, 9.7% from 18 to 24, 29.5% from 25 to 44, 19.3% from 45 to 64, and 10.4% 65 years of age or older. The median age was 31 years. For every 100 females, there were 89.1 males. For every 100 females age 18 and over, there were 83.5 males.

Religion 

According to a 2014 study, 67% of the population of the city identified themselves as Christians, with 49% professing attendance at Protestant churches, and 16% professing Roman Catholic beliefs, while 24% claim no religious affiliation. Other religions collectively make up about 8% of the population.

Income and employment

The loss of industrial and working-class jobs in the city has resulted in high rates of poverty and associated problems. From 2000 to 2009, the city's estimated median household income fell from $29,526 to $26,098. , the mean income of Detroit is below the overall U.S. average by several thousand dollars. Of every three Detroit residents, one lives in poverty. Luke Bergmann, author of Getting Ghost: Two Young Lives and the Struggle for the Soul of an American City, said in 2010, "Detroit is now one of the poorest big cities in the country".

In the 2018 American Community Survey, median household income in the city was $31,283, compared with the median for Michigan of $56,697. The median income for a family was $36,842, well below the state median of $72,036. 33.4% of families had income at or below the federally defined poverty level. Out of the total population, 47.3% of those under the age of 18 and 21.0% of those 65 and older had income at or below the federally defined poverty line.

Oakland County in Metro Detroit, once rated amongst the wealthiest US counties per household, is no longer shown in the top 25 listing of Forbes magazine. But internal county statistical methods—based on measuring per capita income for counties with more than one million residents—show Oakland is still within the top 12, slipping from the fourth-most affluent such county in the U.S. in 2004 to 11th-most affluent in 2009. Detroit dominates Wayne County, which has an average household income of about $38,000, compared to Oakland County's $62,000.

Race and ethnicity

Beginning with the rise of the automobile industry, Detroit's population increased more than sixfold during the first half of the 20th century as an influx of European, Middle Eastern (Lebanese, Assyrian/Chaldean), and Southern migrants brought their families to the city. With this economic boom following World War I, the African American population grew from a mere 6,000 in 1910 to more than 120,000 by 1930. This influx of thousands of African Americans in the 20th century became known as the Great Migration. Perhaps one of the most overt examples of neighborhood discrimination occurred in 1925 when African American physician Ossian Sweet found his home surrounded by an angry mob of his hostile white neighbors violently protesting his new move into a traditionally white neighborhood. Sweet and ten of his family members and friends were put on trial for murder as one of the mob members throwing rocks at the newly purchased house was shot and killed by someone firing out of a second-floor window. Many middle-class families experienced the same kind of hostility as they sought the security of homeownership and the potential for upward mobility.

Detroit has a relatively large Mexican-American population. In the early 20th century, thousands of Mexicans came to Detroit to work in agricultural, automotive, and steel jobs. During the Mexican Repatriation of the 1930s many Mexicans in Detroit were willingly repatriated or forced to repatriate. By the 1940s much of the Mexican community began to settle what is now Mexicantown.

After World War II, many people from Appalachia also settled in Detroit. Appalachians formed communities and their children acquired southern accents. Many Lithuanians also settled in Detroit during the World War II era, especially on the city's Southwest side in the West Vernor area, where the renovated Lithuanian Hall reopened in 2006.

By 1940, 80% of Detroit deeds contained restrictive covenants prohibiting African Americans from buying houses they could afford. These discriminatory tactics were successful as a majority of black people in Detroit resorted to living in all-black neighborhoods such as Black Bottom and Paradise Valley. At this time, white people still made up about 90.4% of the city's population. From the 1940s to the 1970s a second wave of black people moved to Detroit in search of employment and with the desire to escape the Jim Crow laws enforcing segregation in the south. However, they soon found themselves once again excluded from many opportunities in Detroit—through violence and policy perpetuating economic discrimination (e.g., redlining). White residents attacked black homes: breaking windows, starting fires, and detonating bombs. An especially grueling result of this increasing competition between black and white people was the Riot of 1943 that had violent ramifications. This era of intolerance made it almost impossible for African Americans to be successful without access to proper housing or the economic stability to maintain their homes and the conditions of many neighborhoods began to decline. In 1948, the landmark Supreme Court case of Shelley v. Kraemer outlawed restrictive covenants and while racism in housing did not disappear, it allowed affluent black families to begin moving to traditionally white neighborhoods. Many white families with the financial ability moved to the suburbs of Detroit taking their jobs and tax dollars with them, as macrostructural processes such as "white flight" and "suburbanization" led to a complete population shift.

The Detroit riot of 1967 is considered to be one of the greatest racial turning points in the history of the city. The ramifications of the uprising were widespread as there were many allegations of white police brutality towards Black Americans and over $36 million of insured property was lost. Discrimination and deindustrialization in tandem with racial tensions that had been intensifying in the previous years boiled over and led to an event considered to be the most damaging in Detroit's history.

The population of Latinos significantly increased in the 1990s due to immigration from Jalisco. By 2010 Detroit had 48,679 Hispanics, including 36,452 Mexicans: a 70% increase from 1990. While African Americans previously comprised only 13% of Michigan's population, by 2010 they made up nearly 82% of Detroit's population. The next largest population groups were white people, at 10%, and Hispanics, at 6%. In 2001, 103,000 Jews, or about 1.9% of the population, were living in the Detroit area, in both Detroit and Ann Arbor.

According to the 2010 census, segregation in Detroit has decreased in absolute and relative terms and in the first decade of the 21st century, about two-thirds of the total black population in the metropolitan area resided within the city limits of Detroit. The number of integrated neighborhoods increased from 100 in 2000 to 204 in 2010. Detroit also moved down the ranking from number one most segregated city to number four. A 2011 op-ed in The New York Times attributed the decreased segregation rating to the overall exodus from the city, cautioning that these areas may soon become more segregated. This pattern already happened in the 1970s, when apparent integration was a precursor to white flight and resegregation. Over a 60-year period, white flight occurred in the city. According to an estimate of the Michigan Metropolitan Information Center, from 2008 to 2009 the percentage of non-Hispanic White residents increased from 8.4% to 13.3%. As the city has become more gentrified, some empty nesters and many young white people have moved into the city, increasing housing values and once again forcing African Americans to move. Gentrification in Detroit has become a rather controversial issue as reinvestment will hopefully lead to economic growth and an increase in population; however, it has already forced many black families to relocate to the suburbs. Despite revitalization efforts, Detroit remains one of the most racially segregated cities in the United States. One of the implications of racial segregation, which correlates with class segregation, may correlate to overall worse health for some populations.

Asians and Asian Americans

As of 2002, of all of the municipalities in the Wayne County-Oakland County-Macomb County area, Detroit had the second-largest Asian population. As of that year, Detroit's percentage of Asians was 1%, far lower than the 13.3% of Troy. By 2000 Troy had the largest Asian American population in the tri-county area, surpassing Detroit.

There are four areas in Detroit with significant Asian and Asian American populations. Northeast Detroit has a population of Hmong with a smaller group of Lao people. A portion of Detroit next to eastern Hamtramck includes Bangladeshi Americans, Indian Americans, and Pakistani Americans; nearly all of the Bangladeshi population in Detroit lives in that area. Many of those residents own small businesses or work in blue-collar jobs, and the population is mostly Muslim. The area north of Downtown Detroit, including the region around the Henry Ford Hospital, the Detroit Medical Center, and Wayne State University, has transient Asian national origin residents who are university students or hospital workers. Few of them have permanent residency after schooling ends. They are mostly Chinese and Indian but the population also includes Filipinos, Koreans, and Pakistanis. In Southwest Detroit and western Detroit there are smaller, scattered Asian communities including an area in the westside adjacent to Dearborn and Redford Township that has a mostly Indian Asian population, and a community of Vietnamese and Laotians in Southwest Detroit.

, the city has one of the U.S.'s largest concentrations of Hmong Americans. In 2006, the city had about 4,000 Hmong and other Asian immigrant families. Most Hmong live east of Coleman Young Airport near Osborn High School. Hmong immigrant families generally have lower incomes than those of suburban Asian families.

Economy

Several major corporations are based in the city, including three Fortune 500 companies. The most heavily represented sectors are manufacturing (particularly automotive), finance, technology, and health care. The most significant companies based in Detroit include General Motors, Quicken Loans, Ally Financial, Compuware, Shinola, American Axle, Little Caesars, DTE Energy, Lowe Campbell Ewald, Blue Cross Blue Shield of Michigan, and Rossetti Architects.

About 80,500 people work in downtown Detroit, comprising one-fifth of the city's employment base. Aside from the numerous Detroit-based companies listed above, downtown contains large offices for Comerica, Chrysler, Fifth Third Bank, HP Enterprise, Deloitte, PricewaterhouseCoopers, KPMG, and Ernst & Young. Ford Motor Company is in the adjacent city of Dearborn.

Thousands of more employees work in Midtown, north of the central business district. Midtown's anchors are the city's largest single employer Detroit Medical Center, Wayne State University, and the Henry Ford Health System in New Center. Midtown is also home to watchmaker Shinola and an array of small and startup companies. New Center bases TechTown, a research and business incubator hub that is part of the WSU system. Like downtown, Corktown Is experiencing growth with the new Ford Corktown Campus under development.
Midtown also has a fast-growing retailing and restaurant scene.

A number of the city's downtown employers are relatively new, as there has been a marked trend of companies moving from satellite suburbs around Metropolitan Detroit into the downtown core. Compuware completed its world headquarters in downtown in 2003. OnStar, Blue Cross Blue Shield, and HP Enterprise Services are at the Renaissance Center. PricewaterhouseCoopers Plaza offices are adjacent to Ford Field, and Ernst & Young completed its office building at One Kennedy Square in 2006. Perhaps most prominently, in 2010, Quicken Loans, one of the largest mortgage lenders, relocated its world headquarters and 4,000 employees to downtown Detroit, consolidating its suburban offices. In July 2012, the U.S. Patent and Trademark Office opened its Elijah J. McCoy Satellite Office in the Rivertown/Warehouse District as its first location outside Washington, D.C.'s metropolitan area.

In April 2014, the United States Department of Labor reported the city's unemployment rate at 14.5%.

The city of Detroit and other public–private partnerships have attempted to catalyze the region's growth by facilitating the building and historical rehabilitation of residential high-rises in the downtown, creating a zone that offers many business tax incentives, creating recreational spaces such as the Detroit RiverWalk, Campus Martius Park, Dequindre Cut Greenway, and Green Alleys in Midtown. The city itself has cleared sections of land while retaining a number of historically significant vacant buildings in order to spur redevelopment; even though it has struggled with finances, the city issued bonds in 2008 to provide funding for ongoing work to demolish blighted properties. Two years earlier, downtown reported $1.3 billion in restorations and new developments which increased the number of construction jobs in the city. In the decade prior to 2006, downtown gained more than $15 billion in new investment from private and public sectors.

Despite the city's recent financial issues, many developers remain unfazed by Detroit's problems. Midtown is one of the most successful areas within Detroit to have a residential occupancy rate of 96%. Numerous developments have been recently completed or are in various stages of construction. These include the $82 million reconstruction of downtown's David Whitney Building (now an Aloft Hotel and luxury residences), the Woodward Garden Block Development in Midtown, the residential conversion of the David Broderick Tower in downtown, the rehabilitation of the Book Cadillac Hotel (now a Westin and luxury condos) and Fort Shelby Hotel (now Doubletree) also in downtown, and various smaller projects.

Downtown's population of young professionals is growing and retail is expanding. A study in 2007 found out that Downtown's new residents are predominantly young professionals (57% are ages 25 to 34, 45% have bachelor's degrees, and 34% have a master's or professional degree), a trend which has hastened over the last decade. Since 2006, $9 billion has been invested in downtown and surrounding neighborhoods; $5.2 billion of which has come in 2013 and 2014. Construction activity, particularly rehabilitation of historic downtown buildings, has increased markedly. The number of vacant downtown buildings has dropped from nearly 50 to around 13.

On July 25, 2013, Meijer, a midwestern retail chain, opened its first supercenter store in Detroit; this was a $20 million, 190,000-square-foot store in the northern portion of the city and it also is the centerpiece of a new $72 million shopping center named Gateway Marketplace. On June 11, 2015, Meijer opened its second supercenter store in the city. On June 26, 2019, JPMorgan Chase announced plans to invest $50 million more in affordable housing, job training and entrepreneurship by the end of 2022, growing its investment to $200 million.

Arts and culture

In the central portions of Detroit, the population of young professionals, artists, and other transplants is growing and retail is expanding. This dynamic is luring additional new residents, and former residents returning from other cities, to the city's Downtown along with the revitalized Midtown and New Center areas.

A desire to be closer to the urban scene has also attracted some young professionals to reside in inner ring suburbs such as Ferndale and Royal Oak, Michigan. Detroit's proximity to Windsor, Ontario, provides for views and nightlife, along with Ontario's minimum drinking age of 19. A 2011 study by Walk Score recognized Detroit for its above average walkability among large U.S. cities. About two-thirds of suburban residents occasionally dine and attend cultural events or take in professional games in the city of Detroit.

Nicknames

Known as the world's automotive center, "Detroit" is a metonym for that industry. Detroit's auto industry, some of which was converted to wartime defense production, was an important element of the American "Arsenal of Democracy" supporting the Allied powers during World War II. It is an important source of popular music legacies celebrated by the city's two familiar nicknames, the Motor City and Motown. Other nicknames arose in the 20th century, including City of Champions, beginning in the 1930s for its successes in individual and team sport; The D; Hockeytown (a trademark owned by the city's NHL club, the Red Wings); Rock City (after the Kiss song "Detroit Rock City"); and The 313 (its telephone area code).

Music

Live music has been a prominent feature of Detroit's nightlife since the late 1940s, bringing the city recognition under the nickname "Motown". The metropolitan area has many nationally prominent live music venues. Concerts hosted by Live Nation perform throughout the Detroit area. Large concerts are held at DTE Energy Music Theatre. The city's theatre venue circuit is the United States' second largest and hosts Broadway performances.

The city of Detroit has a rich musical heritage and has contributed to a number of different genres over the decades leading into the new millennium. Important music events in the city include the Detroit International Jazz Festival, the Detroit Electronic Music Festival, the Motor City Music Conference (MC2), the Urban Organic Music Conference, the Concert of Colors, and the hip-hop Summer Jamz festival.

In the 1940s, Detroit blues artist John Lee Hooker became a long-term resident in the city's southwest Delray neighborhood. Hooker, among other important blues musicians, migrated from his home in Mississippi, bringing the Delta blues to northern cities like Detroit. Hooker recorded for Fortune Records, the biggest pre-Motown blues/soul label. During the 1950s, the city became a center for jazz, with stars performing in the Black Bottom neighborhood. Prominent emerging jazz musicians included trumpeter Donald Byrd, who attended Cass Tech and performed with Art Blakey and the Jazz Messengers early in his career, and saxophonist Pepper Adams, who enjoyed a solo career and accompanied Byrd on several albums. The Graystone International Jazz Museum documents jazz in Detroit.

Other prominent Motor City R&B stars in the 1950s and early 1960s were Nolan Strong, Andre Williams and Nathaniel Mayer – who all scored local and national hits on the Fortune Records label. According to Smokey Robinson, Strong was a primary influence on his voice as a teenager. The Fortune label, a family-operated label on Third Avenue in Detroit, was owned by the husband-and-wife team of Jack Brown and Devora Brown. Fortune, which also released country, gospel and rockabilly LPs and 45s, laid the groundwork for Motown, which became Detroit's most legendary record label.

Berry Gordy, Jr. founded Motown Records, which rose to prominence during the 1960s and early 1970s with acts such as Stevie Wonder, The Temptations, The Four Tops, Smokey Robinson & The Miracles, Diana Ross & The Supremes, the Jackson 5, Martha and the Vandellas, The Spinners, Gladys Knight & the Pips, The Marvelettes, The Elgins, The Monitors, The Velvelettes and Marvin Gaye. Artists were backed by in-house vocalists The Andantes and The Funk Brothers, the Motown house band that was featured in Paul Justman's 2002 documentary film Standing in the Shadows of Motown, based on Allan Slutsky's book of the same name.

The Motown Sound played an important role in the crossover appeal with popular music, since it was the first African American–owned record label to primarily feature African-American artists. Gordy moved Motown to Los Angeles in 1972 to pursue film production, but the company has since returned to Detroit. Aretha Franklin, another Detroit R&B star, carried the Motown Sound; however, she did not record with Berry's Motown label.

Local artists and bands rose to prominence in the 1960s and '70s, including the MC5, Glenn Frey, The Stooges, Bob Seger, Amboy Dukes featuring Ted Nugent, Mitch Ryder and The Detroit Wheels, Rare Earth, Alice Cooper, and Suzi Quatro. The group Kiss emphasized the city's connection with rock in the song "Detroit Rock City" and the movie produced in 1999. In the 1980s, Detroit was an important center of the hardcore punk rock underground with many nationally known bands coming out of the city and its suburbs, such as The Necros, The Meatmen, and Negative Approach.

In the 1990s and the new millennium, the city has produced a number of influential hip hop artists, including Eminem, the hip-hop artist with the highest cumulative sales, his rap group D12, hip-hop rapper and producer Royce da 5'9", hip-hop producer Denaun Porter, hip-hop producer J Dilla, rapper and musician Kid Rock and rappers Big Sean and Danny Brown. The band Sponge toured and produced music. The city also has an active garage rock scene that has generated national attention with acts such as The White Stripes, The Von Bondies, The Detroit Cobras, The Dirtbombs, Electric Six, and The Hard Lessons.

Detroit is cited as the birthplace of techno music in the early 1980s. The city also lends its name to an early and pioneering genre of electronic dance music, "Detroit techno". Featuring science fiction imagery and robotic themes, its futuristic style was greatly influenced by the geography of Detroit's urban decline and its industrial past. Prominent Detroit techno artists include Juan Atkins, Derrick May, Kevin Saunderson, and Jeff Mills. The Detroit Electronic Music Festival, now known as Movement, occurs annually in late May on Memorial Day Weekend, and takes place in Hart Plaza. In the early years (2000–2002), this was a landmark event, boasting over a million estimated attendees annually, coming from all over the world to celebrate techno music in the city of its birth.

Entertainment and performing arts

Major theaters in Detroit include the Fox Theatre (5,174 seats), Music Hall Center for the Performing Arts  (1,770 seats), the Gem Theatre (451 seats), Masonic Temple Theatre (4,404 seats), the Detroit Opera House (2,765 seats), the Fisher Theatre (2,089 seats), The Fillmore Detroit (2,200 seats), Saint Andrew's Hall, the Majestic Theater, and Orchestra Hall (2,286 seats), which hosts the renowned Detroit Symphony Orchestra. The Nederlander Organization, the largest controller of Broadway productions in New York City, originated with the purchase of the Detroit Opera House in 1922 by the Nederlander family.

Motown Motion Picture Studios with  produces movies in Detroit and the surrounding area based at the Pontiac Centerpoint Business Campus for a film industry expected to employ over 4,000 people in the metro area.

Tourism

Because of its unique culture, distinctive architecture, and revitalization and urban renewal efforts in the 21st century, Detroit has enjoyed increased prominence as a tourist destination in recent years. The New York Times listed Detroit as the ninth-best destination in its list of 52 Places to Go in 2017, while travel guide publisher Lonely Planet named Detroit the second-best city in the world to visit in 2018.

Many of the area's prominent museums are in the historic cultural center neighborhood around Wayne State University and the College for Creative Studies. These museums include the Detroit Institute of Arts, the Detroit Historical Museum, Charles H. Wright Museum of African American History, the Detroit Science Center, as well as the main branch of the Detroit Public Library. Other cultural highlights include Motown Historical Museum, the Ford Piquette Avenue Plant museum, the Pewabic Pottery studio and school, the Tuskegee Airmen Museum, Fort Wayne, the Dossin Great Lakes Museum, the Museum of Contemporary Art Detroit (MOCAD), the Contemporary Art Institute of Detroit (CAID), and the Belle Isle Conservatory.

In 2010, the G.R. N'Namdi Gallery opened in a  complex in Midtown. Important history of America and the Detroit area are exhibited at The Henry Ford in Dearborn, the United States' largest indoor-outdoor museum complex. The Detroit Historical Society provides information about tours of area churches, skyscrapers, and mansions. Inside Detroit, meanwhile, hosts tours, educational programming, and a downtown welcome center. Other sites of interest are the Detroit Zoo in Royal Oak, the Cranbrook Art Museum in Bloomfield Hills, the Anna Scripps Whitcomb Conservatory on Belle Isle, and Walter P. Chrysler Museum in Auburn Hills.

The city's Greektown and three downtown casino resort hotels serve as part of an entertainment hub. The Eastern Market farmer's distribution center is the largest open-air flowerbed market in the United States and has more than 150 foods and specialty businesses. On Saturdays, about 45,000 people shop the city's historic Eastern Market. The Midtown and the New Center area are centered on Wayne State University and Henry Ford Hospital. Midtown has about 50,000 residents and attracts millions of visitors each year to its museums and cultural centers; for example, the Detroit Festival of the Arts in Midtown draws about 350,000 people.

Annual summer events include the Electronic Music Festival, International Jazz Festival, the Woodward Dream Cruise, the African World Festival, the country music Hoedown, Noel Night, and Dally in the Alley. Within downtown, Campus Martius Park hosts large events, including the annual Motown Winter Blast. As the world's traditional automotive center, the city hosts the North American International Auto Show. Held since 1924, America's Thanksgiving Parade is one of the nation's largest. River Days, a five-day summer festival on the International Riverfront lead up to the Windsor–Detroit International Freedom Festival fireworks, which draw super sized-crowds ranging from hundreds of thousands to over three million people.

An important civic sculpture in Detroit is The Spirit of Detroit by Marshall Fredericks at the Coleman Young Municipal Center. The image is often used as a symbol of Detroit and the statue itself is occasionally dressed in sports jerseys to celebrate when a Detroit team is doing well. A memorial to Joe Louis at the intersection of Jefferson and Woodward Avenues was dedicated on October 1, 1986.

Artist Tyree Guyton created the controversial street art exhibit known as the Heidelberg Project in 1986, using found objects including cars, clothing and shoes found in the neighborhood near and on Heidelberg Street on the near East Side of Detroit.

Time named Detroit as one of the fifty World's Greatest Places of 2022 to explore.

Sports

Detroit is one of 13 U.S. metropolitan areas that are home to professional teams representing the four major sports in North America. Since 2017, all of these teams play in the city limits of Detroit itself, a distinction shared with only three other U.S. cities. Detroit is the only U.S. city to have its four major sports teams play within its downtown district.

There are three active major sports venues in the city: Comerica Park (home of the Major League Baseball team Detroit Tigers), Ford Field (home of the NFL's Detroit Lions), and Little Caesars Arena (home of the NHL's Detroit Red Wings and the NBA's Detroit Pistons). A 1996 marketing campaign promoted the nickname "Hockeytown".

The Detroit Tigers have won four World Series titles (1935, 1945, 1968, and 1984). The Detroit Red Wings have won 11 Stanley Cups (1935–36, 1936–37, 1942–43, 1949–50, 1951–52, 1953–54, 1954–55, 1996–97, 1997–98, 2001–02, 2007–08) (the most by an American NHL franchise). The Detroit Lions have won 4 NFL titles (1935, 1952, 1953, 1957) . The Detroit Pistons have won three NBA titles (1989, 1990, 2004). With the Pistons' first of three NBA titles in 1989, the city of Detroit has won titles in all four of the major professional sports leagues. Two new downtown stadiums for the Detroit Tigers and Detroit Lions opened in 2000 and 2002, respectively, returning the Lions to the city proper.

In college sports, Detroit's central location within the Mid-American Conference has made it a frequent site for the league's championship events. While the MAC Basketball Tournament moved permanently to Cleveland starting in 2000, the MAC Football Championship Game has been played at Ford Field in Detroit since 2004, and annually attracts 25,000 to 30,000 fans. The University of Detroit Mercy has an NCAA Division I program, and Wayne State University has both NCAA Division I and II programs. The NCAA football Quick Lane Bowl is held at Ford Field each December.

Detroit's professional soccer team is Detroit City FC. Founded in 2012 as a semi-professional soccer club, the team now plays professional soccer in the USL Championship (USLC). Nicknamed, Le Rouge, the club are two-time champions of NISA since joining in 2020. They play their home matches in Keyworth Stadium, which is located in the Detroit enclave of Hamtramck.

The city hosted the 2005 MLB All-Star Game, 2006 Super Bowl XL, both the 2006 and 2012 World Series, WrestleMania 23 in 2007, and the NCAA Final Four in April 2009. 
The city hosted the Detroit Indy Grand Prix on Belle Isle Park from 1989 to 2001, 2007 to 2008, and 2012 and beyond. In 2007, open-wheel racing returned to Belle Isle with both Indy Racing League and American Le Mans Series Racing. From 1982 to 1988, Detroit held the Detroit Grand Prix, at the Detroit street circuit.

Detroit is one of eight American cities to have won titles in all four major leagues (MLB, NFL, NHL and NBA), though of the eight it is the only one to have not won a Super Bowl title (all of the Lions' titles came prior to the start of the Super Bowl era). In the years following the mid-1930s, Detroit was referred to as the "City of Champions" after the Tigers, Lions, and Red Wings captured the three major professional sports championships in existence at the time in a seven-month period of time (the Tigers won the World Series in October 1935; the Lions won the NFL championship in December 1935; the Red Wings won the Stanley Cup in April 1936). In 1932, Eddie "The Midnight Express" Tolan from Detroit won the 100- and 200-meter races and two gold medals at the 1932 Summer Olympics. Joe Louis won the heavyweight championship of the world in 1937.

Detroit has made the most bids to host the Summer Olympics without ever being awarded the games, with seven unsuccessful bids for the 1944, 1952, 1956, 1960, 1964, 1968, and 1972 summer games.

Government

The city is governed pursuant to the home rule Charter of the City of Detroit. The government of Detroit is run by a mayor, the nine-member Detroit City Council, the eleven-member Board of Police Commissioners, and a clerk. All of these officers are elected on a nonpartisan ballot, with the exception of four of the police commissioners, who are appointed by the mayor. Detroit has a "strong mayoral" system, with the mayor approving departmental appointments. The council approves budgets, but the mayor is not obligated to adhere to any earmarking. The city clerk supervises elections and is formally charged with the maintenance of municipal records. City ordinances and substantially large contracts must be approved by the council. The Detroit City Code is the codification of Detroit's local ordinances.

The city clerk supervises elections and is formally charged with the maintenance of municipal records. Municipal elections for mayor, city council and city clerk are held at four-year intervals, in the year after presidential elections. Following a November 2009 referendum, seven council members will be elected from districts beginning in 2013 while two will continue to be elected at-large.

Detroit's courts are state-administered and elections are nonpartisan. The Probate Court for Wayne County is in the Coleman A. Young Municipal Center in downtown Detroit. The Circuit Court is across Gratiot Avenue in the Frank Murphy Hall of Justice, in downtown Detroit. The city is home to the Thirty-Sixth District Court, as well as the First District of the Michigan Court of Appeals and the United States District Court for the Eastern District of Michigan. The city provides law enforcement through the Detroit Police Department and emergency services through the Detroit Fire Department.

Politics
Beginning with its incorporation in 1802, Detroit has had a total of 74 mayors. Detroit's last mayor from the Republican Party was Louis Miriani, who served from 1957 to 1962. In 1973, the city elected its first black mayor, Coleman Young. Despite development efforts, his combative style during his five terms in office was not well received by many suburban residents. Mayor Dennis Archer, a former Michigan Supreme Court Justice, refocused the city's attention on redevelopment with a plan to permit three casinos downtown. By 2008, three major casino resort hotels established operations in the city.

In 2000, the city requested an investigation by the United States Justice Department into the Detroit Police Department which was concluded in 2003 over allegations regarding its use of force and civil rights violations. The city proceeded with a major reorganization of the Detroit Police Department.

In 2013, felony bribery charges were brought against seven building inspectors. In 2016, further corruption charges were brought against 12 principals, a former school superintendent and supply vendor for a $12 million kickback scheme. However, law professor Peter Henning argues Detroit's corruption is not unusual for a city its size, especially when compared with Chicago.

Detroit is sometimes referred to as a sanctuary city because it has "anti-profiling ordinances that generally prohibit local police from asking about the immigration status of people who are not suspected of any crime".

The city in recent years has been a stronghold for the Democratic Party, with around 94% of votes in the city going to Joe Biden, the Democratic candidate in the 2020 Presidential election.

Public finances
Detroit's protracted decline has resulted in severe urban decay, with thousands of empty buildings around the city, referred to as greyfield. Some parts of Detroit are so sparsely populated the city has difficulty providing municipal services. The city has demolished abandoned homes and buildings, planting grass and trees, and considered removing street lighting from large portions of the city, in order to encourage the small population in certain areas to move to more populated areas. Roughly half of the owners of Detroit's 305,000 properties failed to pay their 2011 tax bills, resulting in about $246 million in taxes and fees going uncollected, nearly half of which was due to Detroit. The rest of the money would have been earmarked for Wayne County, Detroit Public Schools, and the library system.

In March 2013, Governor Rick Snyder declared a financial emergency in the city, stating the city had a $327 million budget deficit and faced more than $14 billion in long-term debt. It has been making ends meet on a month-to-month basis with the help of bond money held in a state escrow account and has instituted mandatory unpaid days off for many city workers. Those troubles, along with underfunded city services, such as police and fire departments, and ineffective turnaround plans from Mayor Bing and the City Council led the state of Michigan to appoint an emergency manager for Detroit on March 14, 2013. On June 14, 2013, Detroit defaulted on $2.5 billion of debt by withholding $39.7 million in interest payments, while Emergency Manager Kevyn Orr met with bondholders and other creditors in an attempt to restructure the city's $18.5 billion debt and avoid bankruptcy. On July 18, 2013, the City of Detroit filed for Chapter 9 bankruptcy protection. It was declared bankrupt by U.S. judge Stephen Rhodes on December 3, with its $18.5 billion debt; he said in accepting the city's contention it is broke and negotiations with its thousands of creditors were infeasible. The city levies an income tax of 2.4 percent on residents and 1.2 percent on nonresidents.

Education

Colleges and universities

Detroit is home to several institutions of higher learning including Wayne State University, a national research university with medical and law schools in the Midtown area offering hundreds of academic degrees and programs. The University of Detroit Mercy, in Northwest Detroit in the University District, is a prominent Roman Catholic co-educational university affiliated with the Society of Jesus (the Jesuits) and the Sisters of Mercy. The University of Detroit Mercy offers more than a hundred academic degrees and programs of study including business, dentistry, law, engineering, architecture, nursing and allied health professions. The University of Detroit Mercy School of Law is Downtown across from the Renaissance Center.

Grand Valley State University's Detroit Center host workshops, seminars, professional development, and other large gatherings in the building. Located in the heart of downtown next to Comerica Park and the Detroit Athletic Club, the center has become a key component for educational activity in the city.

Sacred Heart Major Seminary, founded in 1919, is affiliated with Pontifical University of Saint Thomas Aquinas, Angelicum in Rome and offers pontifical degrees as well as civil undergraduate and graduate degrees. Sacred Heart Major Seminary offers a variety of academic programs for both clerical and lay students. Other institutions in the city include the College for Creative Studies and Wayne County Community College. Marygrove College was a Catholic institution formerly based in Detroit before it closed in 2019. In June 2009, the Michigan State University College of Osteopathic Medicine which is based in East Lansing opened a satellite campus at the Detroit Medical Center. The University of Michigan was established in 1817 in Detroit and later moved to Ann Arbor in 1837.

Primary and secondary schools

 many K-12 students in Detroit frequently change schools, with some children having been enrolled in seven schools before finishing their K-12 careers. There is a concentration of senior high schools and charter schools in the Downtown Detroit area, which had wealthier residents and more gentrification relative to other parts of Detroit: Downtown, northwest Detroit, and northeast Detroit have 1,894, 3,742, and 6,018 students of high school age each, respectively, while they have 11, three, and two high schools each, respectively.

 because of the lack of public transportation and the lack of school bus services, many Detroit families have to rely on themselves to transport children to school.

Public schools and charter schools

With about 66,000 public school students (2011–12), the Detroit Public Schools (DPS) district is the largest school district in Michigan. Detroit has an additional 56,000 charter school students for a combined enrollment of about 122,000 students.  there are about as many students in charter schools as there are in district schools.  DPS continues to have the majority of the special education pupils. In addition, some Detroit students, as of 2016, attend public schools in other municipalities.

In 1999, the Michigan Legislature removed the locally elected board of education amid allegations of mismanagement and replaced it with a reform board appointed by the mayor and governor. The elected board of education was re-established following a city referendum in 2005. The first election of the new 11-member board of education occurred on November 8, 2005.

Due to growing Detroit charter schools enrollment as well as a continued exodus of population, the city planned to close many public schools. State officials report a 68% graduation rate for Detroit's public schools adjusted for those who change schools. Traditional public and charter school students in the city have performed poorly on standardized tests. Circa 2009 and 2011, while Detroit traditional public schools scored a record low on national tests, the publicly funded charter schools did even worse than the traditional public schools.  there were 30,000 excess openings in Detroit traditional public and charter schools, bearing in mind the number of K-12-aged children in the city. In 2016, Kate Zernike of The New York Times stated school performance did not improve despite the proliferation of charters, describing the situation as "lots of choice, with no good choice".

Detroit public schools students scored the lowest on tests of reading and writing of all major cities in the United States in 2015. Among eighth-graders, only 27% showed basic proficiency in math and 44% in reading. Nearly half of Detroit's adults are functionally illiterate.

Private schools
Detroit is served by various private schools, as well as parochial Roman Catholic schools operated by the Archdiocese of Detroit.  there are four Catholic grade schools and three Catholic high schools in the City of Detroit, with all of them in the city's west side. The Archdiocese of Detroit lists a number of primary and secondary schools in the metro area as Catholic education has emigrated to the suburbs. Of the three Catholic high schools in the city, two are operated by the Society of Jesus and the third is co-sponsored by the Sisters, Servants of the Immaculate Heart of Mary and the Congregation of St. Basil.

In the 1964–1965 school year there were about 110 Catholic grade schools in Detroit, Hamtramck, and Highland Park and 55 Catholic high schools in those three cities. The Catholic school population in Detroit has decreased due to the increase of charter schools, increasing tuition at Catholic schools, the small number of African-American Catholics, White Catholics moving to suburbs, and the decreased number of teaching nuns.

Media

The Detroit Free Press and The Detroit News are the major daily newspapers, both broadsheet publications published together under a joint operating agreement called the Detroit Newspaper Partnership. Media philanthropy includes the Detroit Free Press high school journalism program and the Old Newsboys' Goodfellow Fund of Detroit. In March 2009, the two newspapers reduced home delivery to three days a week, print reduced newsstand issues of the papers on non-delivery days and focus resources on Internet-based news delivery. The Metro Times, founded in 1980, is a weekly publication, covering news, arts & entertainment.

Also founded in 1935 and based in Detroit, the Michigan Chronicle is one of the oldest and most respected African-American weekly newspapers in America, covering politics, entertainment, sports and community events. The Detroit television market is the 11th largest in the United States; according to estimates that do not include audiences in large areas of Ontario, Canada (Windsor and its surrounding area on broadcast and cable TV, as well as several other cable markets in Ontario, such as the city of Ottawa) which receive and watch Detroit television stations.

Detroit has the 11th largest radio market in the United States, though this ranking does not take into account Canadian audiences. Nearby Canadian stations such as Windsor's CKLW (whose jingles formerly proclaimed "CKLW-the Motor City") are popular in Detroit.

Crime

Detroit has gained notoriety for its high amount of crime, having struggled with it for decades. The number of homicides in 1974 was 714. 
Crime has since decreased and, in 2014, the murder rate was 43.4 per 100,000, lower than in St. Louis.

The city's downtown typically has lower crime than national and state averages. According to a 2007 analysis, Detroit officials note about 65 to 70 percent of homicides in the city were drug related, with the rate of unsolved murders roughly 70%.

Although the rate of violent crime dropped 11% in 2008, violent crime in Detroit has not declined as much as the national average from 2007 to 2011. The violent crime rate is one of the highest in the United States. Neighborhoodscout.com reported a crime rate of 62.18 per 1,000 residents for property crimes, and 16.73 per 1,000 for violent crimes (compared to national figures of 32 per 1,000 for property crimes and 5 per 1,000 for violent crime in 2008).

In 2012, crime in the city was among the reasons for more expensive car insurance.

About half of all murders in Michigan in 2015 occurred in Detroit. Annual statistics released by the Detroit Police Department for 2016 indicate that while the city's overall crime rate declined that year, the murder rate rose from 2015. In 2016 there were 302 homicides in Detroit, a 2.37% increase in the number of murder victims from the preceding year.

Areas of the city adjacent to the Detroit River are also patrolled by the United States Border Patrol.

Infrastructure

Health systems
Within the city of Detroit, there are over a dozen major hospitals, which include the Detroit Medical Center (DMC), Henry Ford Health System, St. John Health System, and the John D. Dingell VA Medical Center. The DMC, a regional Level I trauma center, consists of Detroit Receiving Hospital and University Health Center, Children's Hospital of Michigan, Harper University Hospital, Hutzel Women's Hospital, Kresge Eye Institute, Rehabilitation Institute of Michigan, Sinai-Grace Hospital, and the Karmanos Cancer Institute. The DMC has more than 2,000 licensed beds and 3,000 affiliated physicians. It is the largest private employer in the City of Detroit. The center is staffed by physicians from the Wayne State University School of Medicine, the largest single-campus medical school in the United States, and the United States' fourth largest medical school overall.

Detroit Medical Center formally became a part of Vanguard Health Systems on December 30, 2010, as a for-profit corporation. Vanguard has agreed to invest nearly $1.5 B in the Detroit Medical Center complex, which will include $417 M to retire debts, at least $350 M in capital expenditures and an additional $500 M for new capital investment. Vanguard has agreed to assume all debts and pension obligations. The metro area has many other hospitals including William Beaumont Hospital, St. Joseph's, and University of Michigan Medical Center.
 
In 2011, Detroit Medical Center and Henry Ford Health System substantially increased investments in medical research facilities and hospitals in the city's Midtown and New Center.

In 2012, two major construction projects were begun in New Center. The Henry Ford Health System started the first phase of a $500 million, 300-acre revitalization project, with the construction of a new $30 million, 275,000-square-foot, Medical Distribution Center for Cardinal Health, Inc. and Wayne State University started construction on a new $93 million, 207,000-square-foot, Integrative Biosciences Center (IBio). As many as 500 researchers and staff will work out of the IBio Center.

Transportation

With its proximity to Canada and its facilities, ports, major highways, rail connections and international airports, Detroit is an important transportation hub. The city has three international border crossings, the Ambassador Bridge, Detroit–Windsor Tunnel and Michigan Central Railway Tunnel, linking Detroit to Windsor, Ontario. The Ambassador Bridge is the single busiest border crossing in North America, carrying 27% of the total trade between the U.S. and Canada.

On February 18, 2015, Canadian Transport Minister Lisa Raitt announced Canada has agreed to pay the entire cost to build a $250 million U.S. Customs plaza adjacent to the planned new Detroit–Windsor bridge, now the Gordie Howe International Bridge. Canada had already planned to pay for 95% of the bridge, which will cost $2.1 billion, and is expected to open in 2024. "This allows Canada and Michigan to move the project forward immediately to its next steps which include further design work and property acquisition on the U.S. side of the border", Raitt said in a statement issued after she spoke in the House of Commons.

Transit systems

Mass transit in the region is provided by bus services. The Detroit Department of Transportation (DDOT) provides service within city limits up to the outer edges of the city. From there, the Suburban Mobility Authority for Regional Transportation (SMART) provides service to the suburbs and the city regionally with local routes and SMART's FAST service. FAST is a new service provided by SMART which offers limited stops along major corridors throughout the Detroit metropolitan area connecting the suburbs to downtown. The new high-frequency service travels along three of Detroit's busiest corridors, Gratiot, Woodward, and Michigan, and only stops at designated FAST stops. Cross border service between the downtown areas of Windsor and Detroit is provided by Transit Windsor via the Tunnel Bus.

An elevated rail system known as the People Mover, completed in 1987, provides daily service around a  loop downtown. The QLINE serves as a link between the Detroit People Mover and Detroit Amtrak station via Woodward Avenue. The SEMCOG Commuter Rail line will extend from Detroit's New Center, connecting to Ann Arbor via Dearborn, Wayne, and Ypsilanti when it is opened.

The Regional Transit Authority (RTA) was established by an act of the Michigan legislature in December 2012 to oversee and coordinate all existing regional mass transit operations, and to develop new transit services in the region. The RTA's first project was the introduction of RelfeX, a limited-stop, cross-county bus service connecting downtown and midtown Detroit with Oakland county via Woodward avenue.

Amtrak provides service to Detroit, operating its Wolverine service between Chicago and Pontiac. The Amtrak station is in New Center north of downtown. The J. W. Westcott II, which delivers mail to lake freighters on the Detroit River, is a floating post office.

Car ownership
The city of Detroit has a higher than average percentage of households without a car. In 2016, 24.7 percent of Detroit households lacked a car, much higher than the national average of 8.7. Detroit averaged 1.15 cars per household in 2016, compared to a national average of 1.8.

Freight railroads
Freight railroad operations in the city of Detroit are provided by Canadian National Railway, Canadian Pacific Railway, Conrail Shared Assets, CSX Transportation and Norfolk Southern Railway, each of which have local yards within the city. Detroit is also served by the Delray Connecting Railroad and Detroit Connecting Railroad shortlines.

Airports

Detroit Metropolitan Wayne County Airport (DTW), the principal airport serving Detroit, is in nearby Romulus. DTW is a primary hub for Delta Air Lines (following its acquisition of Northwest Airlines), and a secondary hub for Spirit Airlines. The airport is connected to Downtown Detroit by the Suburban Mobility Authority for Regional Transportation (SMART) FAST Michigan route.

Coleman A. Young International Airport (DET), previously called Detroit City Airport, is on Detroit's northeast side; the airport now maintains only charter service and general aviation. Willow Run Airport, in far-western Wayne County near Ypsilanti, is a general aviation and cargo airport.

Freeways

Metro Detroit has an extensive toll-free network of freeways administered by the Michigan Department of Transportation. Four major Interstate Highways surround the city. Detroit is connected via Interstate 75 (I-75) and I-96 to Kings Highway 401 and to major Southern Ontario cities such as London, Ontario and the Greater Toronto Area. I-75 (Chrysler and Fisher freeways) is the region's main north–south route, serving Flint, Pontiac, Troy, and Detroit, before continuing south (as the Detroit–Toledo and Seaway Freeways) to serve many of the communities along the shore of Lake Erie.

I-94 (Edsel Ford Freeway) runs east–west through Detroit and serves Ann Arbor to the west (where it continues to Chicago) and Port Huron to the northeast. The stretch of the I-94 freeway from Ypsilanti to Detroit was one of America's earlier limited-access highways. Henry Ford built it to link the factories at Willow Run and Dearborn during World War II. A portion was known as the Willow Run Expressway. The I-96 freeway runs northwest–southeast through Livingston, Oakland and Wayne counties and (as the Jeffries Freeway through Wayne County) has its eastern terminus in downtown Detroit.

I-275 runs north–south from I-75 in the south to the junction of I-96 and I-696 in the north, providing a bypass through the western suburbs of Detroit. I-375 is a short spur route in downtown Detroit, an extension of the Chrysler Freeway. I-696 (Reuther Freeway) runs east–west from the junction of I-96 and I-275, providing a route through the northern suburbs of Detroit. Taken together, I-275 and I-696 form a semicircle around Detroit. Michigan state highways designated with the letter M serve to connect major freeways.

Floating post office

Detroit has a floating post office, the J. W. Westcott II, which serves lake freighters along the Detroit River. Its ZIP Code is 48222. The ZIP Code is used exclusively for the J. W. Westcott II, which makes is the only floating ZIP Code in the United States. It has a land-based office at 12 24th Street, just south of the Ambassador Bridge. The J.W. Westcott Company was established in 1874 by Captain John Ward Westcott as a maritime reporting agency to inform other vessels about port conditions, and the J. W. Westcott II vessel began service in 1949 and is still in operation today.

Notable people

Sister cities
Detroit's sister cities are:
 Chongqing, China
 Dubai, United Arab Emirates
 Kitwe, Zambia
 Minsk, Belarus
 Nassau, Bahamas
 Toyota, Japan
 Turin, Italy

See also
USS Detroit, at least 6 ships

Notes

References

Further reading
 
 
 
 Barrow, Heather B. Henry Ford's Plan for the American Suburb: Dearborn and Detroit. DeKalb, IL: Northern Illinois University Press, 2015.
 Bates, Beth Tompkins. The Making of Black Detroit in the Age of Henry Ford. Chapel Hill, NC: University of North Carolina Press, 2012.
 
 
 
 
 
 
 
 
 
 
 
 
 
 
 
 
 Farmer, Silas. (1884) (July 1969) The history of Detroit and Michigan, or, The metropolis illustrated: a chronological cyclopaedia of the past and present: including a full record of territorial days in Michigan, and the annuals of Wayne County, in various formats at Open Library.
 
 
 Galster, George. (2012). Driving Detroit: The Quest for Respect in the Motor City University of Pennsylvania Press
 
 
 
 
 
 
 
 
 
 
 
 
 
 Philp, Drew (2017). A $500 house in Detroit: rebuilding an abandoned home and an American city. Scribner.
 
 
 
 Powell, L. P (1901). "Detroit, the Queen City", Historic Towns of the Western States (New York).

Primary sources
 Moon, Elaine Latzman. Untold tales, unsung heroes: an oral history of Detroit's African American community, 1918-1967 (1994) online

External links

 
 Detroit Regional Chamber
 Labor, Urban Affairs and Detroit History archival collections at the Walter P. Reuther Library
 Virtual Motor City Collection at Wayne State University Library, contains over 30,000 images of Detroit from 1890 to 1980
 "In Energized Detroit, Savoring an Architectural Legacy". The New York Times. March 26, 2018.

 
Cities in Wayne County, Michigan
County seats in Michigan
Detroit River
Michigan populated places on the Detroit River
Michigan
Government units that have filed for Chapter 9 bankruptcy
Inland port cities and towns of the United States
Metro Detroit
Michigan Neighborhood Enterprise Zone
Populated places established in 1701
Populated places on the Underground Railroad
1701 establishments in New France